Billy is a commune in the Allier department in central France.

Geography

History 
Between this village and nearby Créchy, lagerstätten have yielded a rich assemblage of fossils from the Oligocene-Miocene boundary (c. 24-23 million years ago).

Population

See also 
 Communes of the Allier department

References

External links
 Town hall website 
 Tourist office website  

Communes of Allier
Allier communes articles needing translation from French Wikipedia